Mark S. Cladis (born May 20, 1958) is an author and the Brooke Russell Astor Professor of the Humanities at Brown University. Since arriving at Brown in 2004, he served as Chair for several 3-year terms. His teaching and scholarship are located at the various intersections of religious studies, philosophy, and environmental humanities. He has published five books. His current book project is Radical Romanticism, Democracy, and the Environmental Imagination. He has also published over sixty articles, essays, and chapters in edited books.

Raised in Stanford, California, Cladis attended the University of California, Santa Barbara, where he earned his BA in religious studies. After receiving his doctorate from Princeton University, where he studied philosophy and social theory as they relate to the field of religious studies, he taught at Stanford University and Vassar College, where he served as chair for six years. He arrived at Brown University in 2004 and has served as chair. He is a Brooke Russell Astor Professor of the Humanities, a founding member of Environmental Humanities at Brown (EHAB), and is an active faculty member in Native American and Indigenous Studies at Brown (NAISAB). He has won several awards and fellowships from such organizations as: the Carnegie Foundation, the Fulbright Senior Research Award Program, The Cogut Center for the Humanities, the Rockefeller Foundation, and the Franco-American Commission for Educational Exchange. He was a Fellow and visiting scholar at Oxford University as well as the Maison des Science de l'Homme at the Centre de Recherche en Epistémologie Appliquée, École Polytechnique.

Life, education, and career 

Mark Cladis was raised in Stanford, California. He attended the University of California, Santa Barbara, where he studied religion and philosophy after switching out of a physics and math major. After graduating from UCSB, he continued his education in a doctoral program at Princeton University, where he studied philosophy and social theory as they relate to the field of religious studies. After studying for three years at Princeton, having completed his preliminary exams, he taught at the University of North Carolina, Greensboro for two years. Upon completing his doctorate from Princeton, Cladis taught at Stanford University with a joint appointment in Philosophy and Religious Studies, and then at Vassar College. He now serves as Chair of the Religious Studies Department at Brown University. He lives in Barrington, Rhode Island, with his wife and three children.

Authorship 

 In Search of a Course (Pact Press: A Regal House Imprint, 2020)
 Public Vision, Private Lives (Oxford University Press and Columbia University Press, 2007)
 A Communitarian Defense of Liberalism (Stanford University Press, 1994)
 The Elementary Forms of Religious Life, editor (Oxford University Press, 2001)
 "Durkheim and Foucault: Perspectives on Education and Punishment", editor (Berghahn Books, 2001)

Cladis has also authored over sixty articles, journals, and chapters in edited books. His publications have appeared in such journals, books, and fields of study as:

Philosophy of Religion/Religious Ethics:
 Journal of the American Academy of Religion
 Journal of Religious Ethics
 Religious Studies
 Religion
 Soundings: An Interdisciplinary Journal
 International Journal of Philosophy and Theology
 Immanent Frame: Secularism, Religion, and the Public Sphere

Environmental Humanities:
 Interdisciplinary Studies in Literature and Environment 
 European Journal of Literature, Culture and Environment
 Cambridge Critical Concepts: Nature and Literary Studies (edited book)
 Worldviews: Global Religions, Culture, and Ecology

Religion, Philosophy, and Literature:
 Philosophy and Literature
 Religion and Literature
 Journal of Religion and Literature

Religion and Political and Social Theory:
 The Good Society: The Journal of Political Economy of the Good Society
 History and Theory
 Philosophy and Social Criticism
 Interpretation
 Progressive Politics in the Global Age
 British Journal of Sociology
 Journal of the History of the Behavioral Sciences
 Cambridge Companion to Durkheim (edited book)
 Journal of Moral Education
 Journal of the History of Ideas

Visiting research appointments 

Cladis was a fellow at Wolfson College, Oxford University; a visiting scholar at Oxford's Institute of Social and Cultural Anthropology; a visiting research fellow at Centre de Recherche en
Epistémologie Appliquée, Ecole Polytechnique; and a scholar in residence at Maison Suger: Maison des Science de l’Homme.

Awards 

 Pembroke Faculty Fellow
 John Rowe Workman Award for Excellence in Teaching in the Humanities, Brown University
 Cogut Center for the Humanities: Faculty Fellowship
 National Endowments for the Humanities: Summer Fellowship
 Carnegie Scholar
 Rockefeller Foundation, Bellagio Study Center
 Interfoundational Grant from the Franco-American Commission for Educational Exchange, University of Strasbourg: Religion and Ethics Lecture Series
 Fulbright Senior Research Award 
 National Endowments for the Humanities Summer Stipend

References 

Brown University faculty
Religious studies scholars
1958 births
Living people